Rusakov is a Russian masculine surname, its feminine counterpart is Rusakova. It may refer to
Ivan Vasilyevich Rusakov (1877–1921), Russian revolutionary
Mikhail Rusakov (1892–1963), Soviet geologist
Natalia Rusakova (born 1979), Russian sprinter
Vladimir Rusakov (1909–1951), Soviet general
Vlady Kibalchich Rusakov (1920–2005), Russian-Mexican painter
Igor Rusakov (1959-2003), Figure skating coach

See also
Rusakov Workers' Club
Rusakov particle, a fictional elementary particle in Philip Pullman's His Dark Materials

Russian-language surnames